The HP-45 is the second scientific pocket calculator introduced by Hewlett-Packard, adding to the features of the HP-35. It was introduced in 1973 with an MSRP of US$395. Especially noteworthy was its pioneering addition of a shift key that gave other keys alternate functions.

The calculator was code-named Wizard, which is the first known use of a code name for a calculator.
It also contained an Easter egg that allowed users to access a not-especially accurate stopwatch mode. An accurate version of the stopwatch mode was officially featured in the 1975 successor of the HP-45, the HP-55.

The display of the HP-45 hidden timer showing 00 hours 00 minutes 07 seconds and 58/100 second.

Emulators 
Several individuals and companies make software emulators of the HP 45 series calculators.

 Nonpareil, high-fidelity simulator for calculators Emulates, among other, the HP-45. Licensed under the GNU General Public License (GPL). Available for Microsoft Windows.
 HP-45 Emulator HP-45 Emulator written in Java. Licensed under the GPL 3. Available for Android and Symbian.
 HP-45 Windows Phone 7 App  An Emulator for Windows Phone 7.
 HP-45 Emulator in JavaScript The HP-45 Program ROM was translated to JavaScript to have an exact simulation of the original calculator for use in web browsers.
hp45term Simulates the HP-45 and displays and explains its inner workings. For Linux, MacOS, Windows, CP/M, and more, with minimal mode for low-power machines.

References

Further reading
https://www.google.com/patents/US3892958 Inverse/complementary function prefix key, patent US3892958A

External links
 http://www.hpmuseum.org/hp45.htm
 http://www.digibarn.com/collections/calculators/hp45/index.html
 http://www.xnumber.com/xnumber/WMJ_hp45.htm

45